Anehola Union is a union of Ghatail Upazila, Tangail District, Bangladesh. It is situated 10 km southwest of Ghatail and 24 km north of Tangail, The District Headquarter.

Demographics

According to Population Census 2011 performed by Bangladesh Bureau of Statistics, The total population of Anehola union is 25665. There are  households 6524 in total.

Education

The literacy rate of Anehola Union is 45% (Male-47.3%, Female-42.9%).

See also
 Union Councils of Tangail District

References

Populated places in Dhaka Division
Populated places in Tangail District
Unions of Ghatail Upazila